Jean de Létraz, pen name of Jean Félix Deletraz, (23 February 1897 - 3 June 1954) was a French playwright, spécialising in vaudeville, who authored nearly 118 plays, among which the most famous is Bichon written in 1935.

Biography
His first of more than 100 plays was Opium, a one-act play starring  Sarah Bernhardt during World War I. As well as Bichon (1935), other popular plays of his included On demande un ménage (1942), Descendez, on vous demande (1946), Moumou (1944) and La Fessée (1936). He was also a screenwriter and a dialoguist. A good number of his plays have been adapted to film.

From 1942 until his death, he was managing director of the Théâtre du Palais-Royal where he directed both his own plays and others. He was also a vice-president of a Paris theatre managers' organization.

His wife, Simone, took over the managing of the theatre up to 1965 and staged some of his posthumous works.

Novels 
 Nicole s'éveille (with Suzette Desty, 1926)
 Nicole s'égare (with Suzette Desty, 1926/27)
 Un homme... deux femmes (with Suzette Desty, 1927)
 Douze Nuits d'amour (1927)
 Nicole s'abrite (with Suzette Desty, 1928)
 Un couple passa... (1929)
 La jeune fille et les amants (1930)
 ...tu m'aimes? (1932)

Works in the theatre

Adapted 
 1931 : Chauffeur Antoinette, comedy in 4 acts by Robert Blum, based on a novel by Jean de Létraz and Suzette Desty

Author 
 1934 : Mitzi-Moutzou, opérette in 3 acts, Théâtre des Capucines, 31 March
 1935 : Bichon, three act comedy, Théâtre de la Michodière, 3 May
 1936 : La Fessée, Théâtre de Paris
 1939 : La Poule et le chasseur, Théâtre du Palais-Royal
 1940 : La Familiale, Théâtre de la Michodière with François Périer
 1942 : On demande un ménage, 3 act comedy, Théâtre du Palais-Royal, 22 October
 1942 : Le Fantôme de Madame, Théâtre Saint-Georges, November 
 1943 : La Dame de minuit, Apollo, May
 1943 : Épousez-nous, monsieur, 3 act play, Théâtre Michel, 21 December
 1944 : Moumou, Théâtre du Palais-Royal, 24 May
 1946 : Descendez, on vous demande, comedy in 3 acts, Théâtre du Palais-Royal, 16 March
 1947 : Et vive la liberté, play in 3 acts, Théâtre des Variétés, 19 April
 1947 : Une nuit chez vous, Madame !, Théâtre du Palais-Royal, 9 May
 1947 : Chasse gardée, play in 3 acts, Théâtre du Palais-Royal, 9 May
 1948 : L'Extravagante Théodora, Théâtre des Capucines, 26 May
 1949 : Le Voyage à trois, Théâtre du Palais-Royal
 1949 : Nous avons tous fait la même chose, Théâtre de la Potinière, 26 February
 1950 : Les Femmes de Loth, Théâtre du Palais-Royal, March
 1951 : Une nuit à Megève, Théâtre Michel, December
 1952 : Monsieur de Panama, Apollo, 6 December
 1953 : La Pucelle d'Auteuil, Théâtre du Palais-Royal
 1955 : Elle est folle, Carole, directed by Simone de Létraz, Théâtre du Palais-Royal

Theatre director 
 1947 : Et vive la liberté by Jean de Létraz, Théâtre des Variétés
 1948 : L'Extravagante Théodora by Jean de Létraz, Théâtre des Capucines
 1949 : Le Voyage à trois by Jean de Létraz, Théâtre du Palais-Royal
 1953 : Occupe-toi d'mon minimum by Paul Van Stalle, Théâtre du Palais-Royal
 1953 : La Pucelle d'Auteuil by Jean de Létraz, Théâtre du Palais-Royal
 1953 : ... La Mariée en a deux ! by Jean de Létraz, Théâtre du Palais-Royal
 1957 : La Pucelle d'Auteuil by Jean de Létraz, Théâtre de l'Ambigu-Comique 
 1958 : Les Pieds au mur by Jean Guitton, Théâtre du Palais-Royal

Operetta
 La Belle Saison, music by Jean Delettre

Filmography 
, directed by Herbert Selpin (German, 1932, based on the play Chauffeur Antoinette) 
**The Love Contract, directed by Herbert Selpin (English, 1932, based on the play Chauffeur Antoinette) 
**, directed by Herbert Selpin (French, 1932, based on the play Chauffeur Antoinette) 
Fräulein Liselott, directed by Johannes Guter (German, 1934, based on the play Glück im Haus) 
Bichon, directed by Fernand Rivers (French, 1936, based on the play Bichon) 
, directed by Gideon Wahlberg and John Lindlöf (Swedish, 1937, based on the play Bichon) 
, directed by Pierre Caron (French, 1937, based on the play La Fessée) 
Papà per una notte, directed by Mario Bonnard (Italian, 1939, based on the play Bichon) 
Bajó un ángel del cielo, directed by Luis César Amadori (Spanish, 1942, based on the play Bichon) 
Frederica, directed by Jean Boyer (French, 1942, based on the play Épousez-nous, Monsieur) 
Adrien, directed by Fernandel (French, 1943, based on a play by Jean de Létraz) 
, directed by Maurice Cam (French, 1946, based on the play On demande un ménage) 
Bichon, directed by René Jayet (French, 1948, based on the play Bichon) 
, directed by Henri Lepage (French, 1950, based on the play L'Extravagante Théodora) 
, directed by Jean-Paul Paulin (French, 1950, based on the play Le Voyage à trois) 
Descendez, on vous demande, directed by Jean Laviron (French, 1951, based on the play Descendez, on vous demande) 
Moumou, directed by René Jayet (French, 1951, based on the play Moumou) 
, directed by Raoul André (French, 1953, based on the play Une nuit à Megève) 
, directed by Hans Richter (German, 1956, based on the play Bichon)

Screenwriter 
 1931 : Y'en a pas deux comme Angélique, directed by Roger Lion
 1931 : Le Lit conjugal, directed by Roger Lion
 1932 : The Triangle of Fire, directed by Edmond T. Gréville
 1938 : Le Monsieur de cinq heures, directed by Pierre Caron

Television 
  : 
1969 :  Bichon 
1978 :  La Fessée 
1979 : Une nuit chez vous Madame

References

External links 
 

Theatre directors from Paris
20th-century French dramatists and playwrights
French male screenwriters
20th-century French screenwriters
French male stage actors
French male film actors
Writers from Paris
1897 births
1954 deaths
20th-century French male writers